Hedwig may refer to:

People and fictional characters
 Hedwig (name), a list of people and fictional characters with the given name
 Grzegorz Hedwig (born 1988), Polish slalom canoeist
 Johann Hedwig, (1730–1799), German botanist
 Romanus Adolf Hedwig (1772–1806), German botanist, son of Johann Hedwig
 Hedwig Jagiellon (disambiguation), a list of princesses

Other uses
 Hedwig Fountain, a fountain in Zürich, Switzerland
 Hedwig glass, a type of glass
 Hedwig, code name of Red Hat Linux version 6.0, released in 1999
 476 Hedwig, a main-belt asteroid

See also 
 Hedwig Village, Texas, United States, a city
 St. Hedwig (disambiguation)

de:Hedwig
it:Edvige
hu:Hedvig
no:Hedvig
sk:Hedviga
sv:Hedvig